Muy or MUY may refer to:

 Muy River (Wetetnagami River), a tributary of the Wetetnagami River in Quebec, Canada
 Muyang language, an Afro-Asiatic language spoken in northern Cameroon assigned the ISO 639 code muy
 Mouyondzi Airport, Republic of the Congo, assigned the IATA code MUY

See also 
 Muy Muy, a municipality in Matagalpa Department, Nicaragua
 Le Muy, a commune in the department of Var, France
 
 Mooy (disambiguation)
 Mui (disambiguation)